Arjun Hoysala (born 18 October 1989) is an Indian first-class cricketer who plays for Karnataka. He made his first-class debut for Karnataka against Maharashtra, in the 2016–17 Ranji Trophy, on 7 December 2016.

References

External links
 

1989 births
Living people
Indian cricketers
Karnataka cricketers